Binyiny is a town in Eastern Uganda. It is the largest town in Kween District and the headquarters of the district are located in the town. Kween District is one of the twenty-three new Ugandan districts, created in 2010. Prior to July 2010, the district was part of Kapchorwa District.

Location
The coordinates of the town are:1°25'03.0"N, 34°32'04.0"E (Latitude:1.417500; Longitude:34.534445).

Population
, the exact population of the town of Binyiny is not known.

Points of interest
Te following points of interest are located within the town, or near its borders:
 The headquarters of Kween District Administration
 The offices of Binyiny Town Council
 Binyiny Central Market

See also

References

External links
 Constituencies of Kween District
  Tension Mounts in Kween over Relocation of District Headquarters

Populated places in Uganda
Kween District